Suraj Weerasinghe (born 23 April 1996) is a Sri Lankan cricketer. He made his List A debut for Sri Lanka Navy Sports Club in the 2017–18 Premier Limited Overs Tournament on 11 March 2018.

References

External links
 

1996 births
Living people
Sri Lankan cricketers
Sri Lanka Navy Sports Club cricketers
Place of birth missing (living people)